Gibbsville may refer to:

Gibbsville (TV series), a 1976 American dramatic television series
Gibbsville, Wisconsin, a census-designated place in the town of Lima, Sheboygan County, Wisconsin